Vuslat Doğan Sabancı is a Turkish artist. She is the founder of Vuslat Foundation. She is the Vice Chair of Aydin Dogan Foundation, the board member of Dogan Group of Companies and Hepsiburada the e-commerce platform of Turkey.

Career 
Sabancı is a self-taught artist who lives and works in Istanbul, Turkey. After almost two decades of making art privately, her first exhibition took place in May of 2022, “Silence”, curated by Chus Martinez at Pi Artworks Gallery in London.

In 2020, Sabancı established Vuslat Foundation, a philanthropic initiative that focuses on what it called the skill of "Generous Listening" or "hearing beyond words". The Foundation's work was launched at the 17th Venice Architecture Biennale, presenting Italian artist Giuseppe Penone's installation “The Listener”.

Philanthropy
A law was enacted on domestic violence following an eight-year effort on her part through the “No More Domestic Violence” campaign she has initiated while she was the chief executive officer of Hürriyet.

Sabancı also helped establish a platform to gather all Non Profit Organisations formed around issues concerning women under the same roof, and function as a pressure lobby to ensure more women could be voted into the Parliament, prior to the General Elections in 2010. As a consequence of this effort, the number of female MPs rose to 78 after the 2011 elections, from 48.

References

1971 births
Living people
Doğan family
Turkish chief executives
School of International and Public Affairs, Columbia University alumni
Turkish sculptors
Women chief executives
Bilkent University alumni
Businesspeople from Istanbul